The Olympus PEN E-P7 is a mirrorless interchangeable-lens camera launched on 25 June 2021 by OM Digital Solutions under the Olympus brand. OM Digital Solutions became independent from Olympus Corporation on 9 October 2020 and took over the OM-D, PEN and ZUIKO brands. It is the first new model to be launched by OM Digital Solutions since its independence, with a retro-style design that echoes the design of the PEN-F launched in 2016, with aluminium dials and a pop-up flash. Though released recently, the E-P7 does not feature a USB Type-C port, but a Micro USB Type-B port as seen in previous generations.

References

External links 

 

PEN E-P7
PEN E-P7
Cameras introduced in 2021